Sylvia Miles (née Scheinwald; September 9, 1924 – June 12, 2019) was an American actress. She was twice nominated for the Academy Award for Best Supporting Actress for her performances in Midnight Cowboy (1969) and Farewell, My Lovely (1975).

Miles was a fixture in New York City society, having lived there her entire life. She performed in many Off-broadway shows, including starring in a one-woman musical based on her life, titled It's Me, Sylvia! in 1981. A documentary about her life titled I Was Always Sylvia aired on New York City public television channel WNET as part of The 51st State series.

Early life 
Miles was born and raised in Greenwich Village, New York City. She was the second daughter of Jewish parents, Belle (née Feldman)  and Reuben Scheinwald,   a furniture maker. She was educated at Washington Irving High School and the Actors Studio.

Career 
Miles began her career on stage in 1947 and on television and film in 1954. In the early 1960s, she played the role of Sally Rogers in the pilot episode of what would become The Dick Van Dyke Show, which was later taken by Rose Marie for the series. She appeared Off-Broadway in “Ruthless!” The Musical (1992) at the Players Theatre, NYC, playing Sylvia St. Croix (originally played by Joel Vig in drag); she was one of the few females to play the role. She appeared on Broadway in two productions, most notably the 1976 revival of The Night of the Iguana.
Miles was cast in the film Midnight Cowboy (1969) as an aging Park Avenue kept-woman, who invites Joe Buck (Jon Voight) up to her penthouse apartment for sex—another role in which Miles showed off her voluptuous figure (cf. as Red in "The Thin White Line," Route 66, S2E11). The role earned her an Academy Award nomination for Best Supporting Actress, although she appeared on-screen for about six minutes. She received a second Oscar nomination for Best Supporting Actress for her slightly larger role (eight minutes)  in Farewell, My Lovely (1975).

Miles had a role in the Indian suspense film Shalimar (1978). She appeared in Evil Under the Sun (1982), the film version of Agatha Christie's novel of the same name, portraying a Broadway producer, one of her more mainstream film roles. She played real-estate agent Dolores in the Oliver Stone film Wall Street (1987), a role she  reprised in Wall Street: Money Never Sleeps (2010).

Wayland Flowers and his puppet Madame first uttered the widely quoted line, "Sylvia Miles and Andy Warhol would attend the opening of an envelope". In 1976, People magazine repeated the joke without citing a source. Miles starred in Warhol's feature film Heat (1972). appearing in a long lingering scene nude with Joe Dallesandro She was also featured in mainstream films including 92 in the Shade, Critical Condition, The Great Scout & Cathouse Thursday, Crossing Delancey, and the 1989 comedy She-Devil, in which she played the mother of Meryl Streep's character.

In a New York restaurant in 1973, Miles publicly dumped a plate of food onto critic John Simon's head for his negative comments about her in a review of a play she starred in.

In 1975, Miles complained about being typecast as a prostitute in almost all of her then 14 movies and 26 off-Broadway plays to date. "Do I look like a prostitute? What does a hooker look like, anyway? Me?"

In her final years, Miles appeared in a few roles on television such as Sex and the City and One Life to Live, and in the films Go Go Tales and Wall Street: Money Never Sleeps.

Personal life 
In 1948, Miles married William Myers, but the couple divorced two years later. From 1952 to 1958, she was married to Gerald Price. From 1963 to 1970, she was married to radio disc jockey Ted Brown. Brown cited Miles' lack of desire to have children as the main cause for their divorce.

Death 
Miles died on June 12, 2019 while en route to Mount Sinai Hospital in Manhattan at the age of 94. She had been in declining health in recent years and was in nursing home care in her final months. During Miles' final years she was suffering from anemia and respiratory issues.

Filmography

Film

Television

Sources:

References

External links 

Sylvia Miles at the University of Wisconsin's Actors Studio audio collection

1924 births
2019 deaths
20th-century American actresses
20th-century births
21st-century American actresses
Actresses from New York City
American film actresses
American stage actresses
American television actresses
Jewish American actresses
People from Greenwich Village
Washington Irving High School (New York City) alumni
21st-century American Jews